Lučica may refer to:

 Lučica, Croatia, village near Karlovac, Croatia
 Skrivena Luka, village on the island of Lastovo, Croatia
 Lučica (Požarevac), village in Serbia

See also
 Lučice (disambiguation)